Curran v. Mount Diablo Council of the Boy Scouts of America, 17 Cal.4th 670, 952 P.2d 218, 72 Cal.Rptr.2d 410 (1998), was a landmark case which upheld the right of a private organization in California to not allow new members on the basis of their sexual orientation. Its companion case was Randall v. Orange County Council, 17 Cal.4th 736, 952 P.2d 261, 72 Cal.Rptr.2d 453 (1998).

Background
In 1980, eighteen-year-old Tim Curran, an Eagle Scout, applied to be an assistant Scoutmaster in the Mount Diablo Council Boy Scouts of America. Members of the Boy Scouts of America, however, had recently learned that Curran was gay after reading an Oakland Tribune article on gay youth which featured an interview with Curran. Based on his sexual orientation, the Boy Scouts of America refused to allow Curran to hold a leadership position in their organization.

Curran sued in 1981, alleging that the Boy Scouts of America's membership requirements amounted to unlawful discrimination under California's Unruh Civil Rights Act, which required "Full and equal accommodations, advantages, facilities, privileges or services in all business establishments".

Decision
This case was ultimately decided in 1998, when the California Supreme Court ruled in favor of the Boy Scouts of America. The court held that because the Boy Scouts of America was not considered a “business establishment” under the Unruh Civil Rights Act, it could not be required to change its membership policies so as to include homosexuals.

Psychiatrist and lawyer Richard Green was co-counsel for Curran.

References

External links
 
 
 

California state case law
Boy Scouts of America litigation
United States LGBT rights case law
1998 in United States case law
1998 in California
1998 in LGBT history